Jean Corti (1929 – 25 November 2015) was an Italian-French accordionist and composer. He was the accompanist of Jacques Brel for six years, from 1960 to 1966.

Career
Corti composed several songs, either alone (Les Bourgeois), with Brel and Gérard Jouannest (Les Vieux, Madeleine, The Toros), or with Gerard Jouannest (Titine). He regularly collaborated with the group Têtes Raides during the mid-1990s, and group members persuaded him to release his own albums, such as Fiorina. In 2000, he played the song Né Dans les Rues with the French reggae singer Pierpoljak.

Discography

Albums with Jacques Brel
 Marieke (1961)
 Olympia 1961 (1962)
 Les Bourgeois (1962)
 Olympia 1964 (1964)
 Les Bonbons (1966)
 Ces gens-là (1966)

Solo songs
 Couka (2001)
 Versatile (with Loïc Lantoine) (2007)
 Fiorina (with Allain Leprest, Thomas Fersen, and others) (2009)

References

1929 births
2015 deaths
French accordionists
Italian accordionists